The 1998–99 Belgian Hockey League season was the 79th season of the Belgian Hockey League, the top level of ice hockey in Belgium. Five teams participated in the league, and Olympia Heist op den Berg won the championship.

First round

Qualification for final round 

 Yeti Bears Eeklo - IHC Leuven 2:15

Final round

Playoffs

3rd place 
 Griffoens Geel - IHC Leuven 5:5/0:7

Final 
 Olympia Heist op den Berg - HYC Herentals 6:3/5:4

References
Season on hockeyarchives.info

Belgian Hockey League
Belgian Hockey League seasons
Bel